The 2012 Copa Argentina Final was the 185th. and final match of the 2011–12 Copa Argentina, the first edition of the national cup relaunched by AFA in 2011. It was played in single match between Boca Juniors and Racing Club, on August 8, 2012 at the Estadio San Juan del Bicentenario. The winner qualified to play the 2012 Copa Sudamericana. 

Boca Juniors won the match 2–1 with goals by strikers Santiago Silva and Lucas Viatri, achieving their 2nd. Copa Argentina title.

Qualified teams

Road to the final

Match

Details

Statistics

References

Copa
2012
a
a